The Asia Series was an international club baseball competition, contested by the champions of all four of the professional leagues that are associated with the World Baseball Softball Confederation (WBSC) — Australian Baseball League (ABL), Chinese Professional Baseball League (CPBL), Korea Baseball Organization League (KBO League), and Nippon Professional Baseball (NPB) — along with the CEB European Champion Cup holder and the host city, to bring the number of teams up to six.

The competition was co-sponsored by NPB Association and Konami from 2005 to 2007 and was therefore known as the Konami Cup. Furthermore, the participation was limited to the East Asian countries (Japan, South Korea, Taiwan and China). The tournament was stopped between 2009 and 2010 due to financing issues. It was re-introduced in 2011 and has been hosted by Taiwan and South Korea, unlike the previous, which were held in Japan.

Following the 2013 edition, the Asia Series was discontinued due to the scheduling issues.

Background
The Asia Series began in 2005 as a tournament among the champions of NPB, KBO League and CPBL and an All-Star team from China Baseball League (CBL), which was called China Stars. Konami co-sponsored the competition until 2007, when the 2008 season became the first Asia Series. Additionally, it was the first time that the champion of CBL was appointed for the tournament, instead of an All-Star line-up.

The withdrawal of Konami raised in the following years financing issues. The 2009 season was reduced to a single-game championship between the champions of NPB and KBO League and held at the Nagasaki Stadium. The Yomiuri Giants won against the Kia Tigers by 9–4.

A potential 2010 season was then cancelled due to a conflict with the 2010 Asian Games and replaced by another sets of Club Championship. The KBO League champion SK Wyverns first split the two-game championship with CPBL champion Brother Elephants at the Taichung Stadium, before being defeated in a single-game championship by the NPB champion Chiba Lotte Marines at the Tokyo Dome with 3–0.

The subject of re-introducing the event for 2011 was discussed in a November 2010 meeting between the heads of the NPB, KBO, CPBL, and ABL. The CPBL offered to host the event in November 2011. The ABL, whose season runs from November through February, added a bye week in its schedule to allow the champion of the season before to participate in the Asia Series.

In 2013, Fortitudo Baseball Bologna of the Italian Baseball League competed as the first representative of Europe to participate in the tournament, qualifying as the 2013 CEB European Cup champion. Due to the CBL's hiatus that year, the tournament remained at six teams.

The 2014 and 2015 seasons were cancelled due to scheduling issues.

Format
Each of the teams participated in a round-robin series, playing each other team once. The two teams with the best win-loss percentage faced each other in the final, with the team finishing higher considered the "home team", meaning that they had the advantage of batting last. If teams were tied a series of tiebreakers were used to decide which teams qualified for the final and in what order, firstly using the head-to-head win–loss records amongst tied teams, and if necessary the ranking based on the lowest team run average. All games have the designated hitter rule in effect, though not all participating teams would have it in their regular league.

Participants

Finals results

Konami Cup
2005–2007

Asia Series
2008, 2011–2013

Series records

By country

By club

1: Participated in 2006 under its old name La New Bears
2: Participated in 2005 under its old name Sinon Bulls

See also
 Asia Professional Baseball Championship
 MLB Japan All-Star Series
 WBSC Premier12
 Caribbean Series
 Latin American Series
 European Cup
 World Baseball Classic
 Baseball awards#Asia

References

External links

 Asia Series 2013 official website 

 
International baseball competitions in Asia
Recurring sporting events established in 2005